Kömürcübent Nature Park is a nature park located in Sarıyer district of Istanbul Province, Turkey.

Kömürcübent is situated inside the Belgrad Forest at Bahçeköy neighborhood of Sarıyer.It is reached after entering the Belgrad Forest through its Bahçeköy Gate, and passing by Neşet Suyu Nature Park and Falih Rıfkı Atay Nature Park. The area was declared a nature park by the Ministry of Environment and Forest in 2011, and is one of the nine nature parks inside the Belgrad Forest. The protected area is named for the historic dam Kömürcübent, which was built on Topuz Creek in 1620 by the Ottoman sultan Osman II (reigned 1618–1622). The dam is the oldest one in the Belgrad Forest. Next to the nature park, there is a deer farm. 

The nature park offers outdoor recreation activities such as hiking, cycling and picnicing for visitors on daily basis. There is an outdoor restaurant, an outdoor coffeehouse and playgrounds for children. Admission is charged for visitors and vehicles.

Ecosystem
The nature park is rich on flora and fauna.

Flora
Dominant tree species are oak (Quercus petraea) and  hornbeam (Carpinus betulus) while on the creek banks common ash and alder are found. Other plants of the nature park are blackthorn (Prunus spinosa),butcher's-broom (Ruscus aculeatus), Anatolian Sarsaparilla (Smilax excelsa) and European ivy (Hedera helix).

Fauna
Animals observed in the nature park are the mammals jackal, porcupine, squirrel, the reptile tortoise, the bird species European goldfinch and finch.

See also
 Ayvat Bendi Nature Park
 Bentler Nature Park
 Falih Rıfkı Atay Nature Park
 Fatih Çeşmesi Nature Park
 Irmak Nature Park
 Kirazlıbent Nature Park
 Mehmet Akif Ersoy Nature Park
 Neşet Suyu Nature Park

References

Nature parks in Turkey
Protected areas established in 2011
2011 establishments in Turkey
Parks in Istanbul
Sarıyer
Belgrad Forest